Xylo or may refer to:

 Xylø, American singer
 Mahindra Xylo, an Indian compact MPV
 Scott Xylo, British producer and songwriter
 Xyloband, a radio frequency-receiving light-up wristband